Eid al-Adha or the Holiday of Sacrifice is the second and the larger of the two main holidays celebrated in Islam (the other being Eid al-Fitr). It honours the willingness of Abraham (Ibrahim) to sacrifice his son Ishmael (Ismail) as an act of obedience to God's command. Before Abraham could sacrifice his son, however, God provided him with a lamb which he was supposed to kill in his son's place because of his willingness to sacrifice his own son in the name of God. In commemoration of this intervention, animals are ritually sacrificed. Part of their meat is consumed by the family which offers the animal, while the rest of the meat is distributed to the poor and the needy. Sweets and gifts are given, and extended family members are typically visited and welcomed. The day is also sometimes called the Greater Eid.

In the Islamic lunar calendar, Eid al-Adha falls on the tenth day of Dhu al-Hijjah and lasts for four days. In the international (Gregorian) calendar, the dates vary from year to year, shifting approximately 11 days earlier each year.

Pronunciation

Etymology
The Arabic word  means 'festival', 'celebration', 'feast day', or 'holiday'. It itself is a triliteral root  (ʕ-y-d) with associated root meanings of "to go back, to rescind, to accrue, to be accustomed, habits, to repeat, to be experienced; appointed time or place, anniversary, feast day". Arthur Jeffery contests this etymology, and believes the term to have been borrowed into Arabic from Syriac, or less likely Targumic Aramaic.

The first word comes from the triliteral root  with associated meanings of "immolate ; offer up ; sacrifice ; victimize". No occurrence of this root with a meaning related to sacrifice occurs in the Qur'an but in the Hadith literature. Arab Christians use the term to mean the Eucharistic host. The second word derives from the triliteral root  with associated meanings of "closeness, proximity... to moderate; kinship...; to hurry; ...to seek, to seek water sources...; scabbard, sheath; small boat; sacrifice". Arthur Jeffery recognizes the same Semitic root, but believes the sense of the term to have entered Arabic through Aramaic. The word is still used by Aramaic Christians for the Communion service, see Eucharist above. Compare Hebrew korban .

Origin
One of the main trials of Abraham's life was to face the command of God by killing his beloved son. According to the narrative, Abraham kept having nightmares that he was sacrificing his son Ishmael, son of Hagar (Hajar). Abraham knew that this was a command from God and he told his son, as stated in the Quran, Abraham prepared to submit to the will of God and to slaughter his son as an act of faith and obedience to God. During the preparation, Iblis (Satan) tempted Abraham and his family by trying to dissuade them from carrying out God's commandment, and Abraham drove Iblis away by throwing pebbles at him. In commemoration of their rejection of Iblis, stones are thrown during Hajj rites at symbolic pillars, symbolising the place at which Iblis tried to dissuade Abraham

Acknowledging that Abraham was willing to sacrifice what is dear to him, God honoured both Abraham and Ishmael. Angel Gabriel (Jibreel) called Abraham, "O' Ibrahim, you have fulfilled the revelations." and a lamb from heaven was offered by Angel Gabriel to prophet Abraham to slaughter instead of Ishmael. Muslims worldwide celebrate Eid al Adha to commemorate both the devotion of Abraham and the survival of Ishmael.

This story is known as the Akedah in Judaism (Binding of Isaac) and originates in the Torah, the first book of Moses (Genesis, Ch. 22). The Quran refers to the Akedah as follows:

The word "Eid" appears once in Al-Ma'ida, the fifth surah of the Quran, with the meaning "a festival or a feast".

Slaughter on Eid al-Adha 

The tradition for Eid al-Adha involves slaughtering an animal and sharing the meat in three equal parts – for family, for relatives and friends, and for poor people. The goal is to make sure every Muslim gets to eat meat.

Eid prayers

Devotees offer the Eid al-Adha prayers at the mosque. The Eid al-Adha prayer is performed any time after the sun completely rises up to just before the entering of Zuhr time, on the tenth of Dhu al-Hijjah. In the event of a force majeure (e.g. natural disaster), the prayer may be delayed to the 11th of Dhu al-Hijjah and then to the 12th of Dhu al-Hijjah.

Eid prayers must be offered in congregation. Participation of women in the prayer congregation varies from community to community. It consists of two rakats (units) with seven takbirs in the first Raka'ah and five Takbirs in the second Raka'ah. For Shia Muslims, Salat al-Eid differs from the five daily canonical prayers in that no adhan (call to prayer) or iqama (call) is pronounced for the two Eid prayers. The salat (prayer) is then followed by the khutbah, or sermon, by the Imam.

At the conclusion of the prayers and sermon, Muslims embrace and exchange greetings with one another (Eid Mubarak), give gifts and visit one another. Many Muslims also take this opportunity to invite their friends, neighbours, co-workers and classmates to their Eid festivities to better acquaint them about Islam and Muslim culture.

Traditions and practices

During Eid al-Adha, distributing meat amongst the people, chanting the takbir out loud before the Eid prayers on the first day and after prayers throughout the four days of Eid, are considered essential parts of this important Islamic festival.

The takbir consists of:

Adults and children are expected to dress in their finest clothing to perform Eid prayer in a large congregation in an open waqf ("stopping") field called Eidgah or mosque. Affluent Muslims who can afford it sacrifice their best halal domestic animals (usually a camel, goat, sheep, or ram depending on the region) as a symbol of Abraham's willingness to sacrifice his only son. The sacrificed animals, called , known also by the Perso-Arabic term qurbāni, have to meet certain age and quality standards or else the animal is considered an unacceptable sacrifice. In Pakistan alone nearly ten million animals are sacrificed on Eid days, costing over $2 billion.

The meat from the sacrificed animal is preferred to be divided into three parts. The family retains one-third of the share; another third is given to relatives, friends, and neighbors; and the remaining third is given to the poor and needy.

Muslims wear their new or best clothes. People cook special sweets, including ma'amoul (filled shortbread cookies) and samosas. They gather with family and friends.

Eid al-Adha in the Gregorian calendar

While Eid al-Adha is always on the same day of the Islamic calendar, the date on the Gregorian calendar varies from year to year since the Islamic calendar is a lunar calendar and the Gregorian calendar is a solar calendar. The lunar calendar is approximately eleven days shorter than the solar calendar. Each year, Eid al-Adha (like other Islamic holidays) falls on one of about two to four Gregorian dates in parts of the world, because the boundary of crescent visibility is different from the International Date Line.

The following list shows the official dates of Eid al-Adha for Saudi Arabia as announced by the Supreme Judicial Council. Future dates are estimated according to the Umm al-Qura calendar of Saudi Arabia. The Umm al-Qura calendar is just a guide for planning purposes and not the absolute determinant or fixer of dates. Confirmations of actual dates by moon sighting are applied on the 29th day of the lunar month prior to Dhu al-Hijjah to announce the specific dates for both Hajj rituals and the subsequent Eid festival. The three days after the listed date are also part of the festival. The time before the listed date the pilgrims visit Mount Arafat and descend from it after sunrise of the listed day.

In many countries, the start of any lunar Hijri month varies based on the observation of new moon by local religious authorities, so the exact day of celebration varies by locality.

Explanatory notes

Note: Because the Hijri year differs by about 11 days from the AD year, Eid al-Adha can occur twice a year, in the year 1029, 1062, 1094, 1127, 1159, 1192, 1224, 1257, 1290, 1322, 1355, 1387, 1420, 1452, 1485, 1518, 1550, 1583, 1615, 1648, 1681, 1713, 1746, 1778, 1811, 1844, 1876, 1909, 1941, 1974, 2006, 2039, 2072, 2104, 2137, 2169, 2202, 2235, 2267 and 2300 (will continue to occur every 32 or 33 years).

References

External links

 

Abraham in Islam
Animal festival or ritual
Druze festivals and holy days
Adha
Hajj
Islamic holy days
Islamic terminology
Public holidays in Algeria
Public holidays in Azerbaijan
Public holidays in India
Public holidays in Pakistan
Public holidays in Bangladesh
Public holidays in Myanmar
Hari Raya Haji
Public holidays in Sri Lanka
Public holidays in Turkey
Public holidays in Malaysia